Karsa may refer to:

 Karsa (League of Legends player) (born 1997), Taiwanese professional eSports player
 Karsa, Kenya, a basalt geological formation, archaeological site, and watering hole on Lake Turkana
 Karsa River, in western Ethiopia
 Karsa, India, a village in Nilokheri tehsil, Karnal, Haryana
 Karsa Orlong, a character in the Malazan Book of the Fallen epic fantasy series by Steven Erikson

See also
 Kärsa (disambiguation)